John Enys may refer to:
 John Enys (British Army officer)
 John Enys (naturalist)
 John Samuel Enys, British mining engineer and scientist